The Lincolnshire Football League is an English football league. The league has one division, which stands at level 11 of the English football league system).

History
The League runs a representative side that compete in the FA Inter League Cup. In their first venture into the competition, they reached the quarter-final stage where they lost to the Cheshire League. In the 2012–13 campaign, they also lost in the quarter-finals to the Humber Premier League.

In May 2017 the Lincolnshire League became a member of the English football league system and initially National League System (NLS) following the FA elevating it to Step 7 status (level 11 overall), which was abolished in 2020 and the league redesignated as an NLS feeder, subject to the league champions having the necessary ground grading and desire to do so. Clubs had, in recent years, moved up to the Northern Counties East Football League, Central Midlands League and the United Counties League.

Current member clubs (2022–23)
 Appleby Frodingham
 Barton Town Reserves
 Brigg Town CIC
 Cleethorpes Town Reserves
 Crowle Colts
 Grimsby Borough Reserves
 Horncastle Town
 Immingham Town
 Keelby United (Sat)
 Lincoln Moorlands Railway AFC
 Lincoln United Development
 Louth Town
 Nettleham (Sat)
 Nunsthorpe (Sat)
 Skegness Town Reserves
 Sleaford Town Rangers
 Tetney Rovers
 Wyberton

Champions

References

External links
Lincolnshire Football League at FA Full Time

 
Football leagues in England
Football in Lincolnshire